Grupo Herdez is a family-owned Mexican food company founded in 1914. After the 1985–1986 Hormel strike, Hormel collaborated with Grupo Herdez to sell Mexican food in the United States. Grupo Herdez also sold Hormel products in Mexico. Since 1991, Grupo Herdez has been listed on the Mexican Stock Exchange.

References

1914 establishments in Mexico
Publicly traded companies of Mexico
Food and drink companies of Mexico
Food and drink companies established in 1914